Bisheh Waterfall (Lurish: آوشار بیشَه) is a waterfall in the village of Istgah-e Bisheh, Central District in Dorud County, Iran. Bisheh waterfall, is the 48th national monument that was included in Iran's natural heritage list by the Cultural Heritage Organization on March 27, 2008.

Description
The waterfall, with the nearby oak forest, is a popular tourist attraction because of its scenic location and nearby train station.

The name of Bisheh Waterfall is taken from Bisheh Village. The people of this village speak Khorramabadi Luri and Bakhtiyari Luri.

Access path 
It is 30 kilometers southeast of Durood. By train, with the Durood railway route,  it is about 35 minutes. By car It is 130 km away from Durood. This waterfall is located next to the Bisheh railway station on the south-Tehran route. Access to this waterfall by car is through Khorram Abad city, which is about 60 kilometers. The asphalt access road is through Khoramabad city in the heart of the Zagros mountains and in the Papi section.

References

External links

Waterfalls of Iran
Landforms of Lorestan Province
Dorud County
Waterfalls of Lorestan Province